Rove may refer to:

Places
 Le Rove, a commune in the Bouches-du-Rhône department in southern France
 Rove, Honiara, a suburb of Honiara, Solomon Islands
 Rove, Vojnik, a settlement in the hills east of Frankolovo in the Municipality of Vojnik in eastern Slovenia
 Rove, Zagorje ob Savi, a village northwest of Zagorje ob Savi in central Slovenia
 Rove Formation, geological formation in upper northeastern part of Cook County, Minnesota, United States, extending into Ontario, Canada
 Rove Tunnel, a canal tunnel in France that connected Marseille to the Rhône river opened in 1927 and closed in 1963.

People
Rove McManus (born 1974), Australian TV and radio host
Rove (TV series), formerly Rove Live, was an Australian television variety show 
Rove Live Radio, Australian radio programme from 2002 to 2004 hosted by Rove McManus
Rove LA, Australian television comedy talk show set in Los Angeles 
 Karl Rove (born 1950), American political strategist
 Kristiina Rove (born 1990), Finnish alpine ski racer
 Olavi Rove (1915–1966), Finnish gymnast and Olympic champion

Others
 Rove beetle, members of the short-winged beetle family Staphylinidae
 Pictured rove beetle (Thinopinus pictus), wingless rove beetle which lives on the West Coast of the United States from southern Alaska to Baja California
 Rove goat, a breed of goat
 Rove Digital, Estonian IT company which gained fame as a producer of copious amounts of spam, and as a major distributor of trojans
 Rove, the past participle of the verb "reeve", a nautical term meaning to thread a line through blocks in order to gain a mechanical advantage